Lachhimi Sakhi (1841–1914 born in Saran, Bihar), also Laxmi Das, Lakshmi Sakhi and Laxmi Sakhi was a Saint and Bhojpuri poet and writer, who is mainly known for his Bhajans and Kajari songs. His real name was Lachhimi Das but since he was a follower of Sakhi sect that's why he is also known as Lachhimi Sakhi. He has written four Bhojpuri books named Amar Pharas, Amar Bilas, Amar Kahani and Amar Sidhi.

Life 
He was born in 1841 in Amnaur village of Saran district of Bihar. His father was Munshi Jagmohan Das. He was not much educated and only had knowledge of Bhojpuri and Persian. In 1857-58 he joined the Aghoris, but he didn't like their customs and left it after some time. After that he lived in Kaithvaliya Math of Motihari for some time and then made a hut at the bank of Narayani River in Terua village. After years of Meditation, finally he got Enlightenment in 1862.

Philosophy 
He was the follower of Sakhi sect, in which the  God is considered as Husband and soul is considered as wife. The sect doesn't believe in Untouchability and the followers don't wear Saris. He started the tradition of writing poems or songs by assuming Rama as Sakhi (friend). He was the believer of Nirguna god. He has called that omnipresent god Raghunatha, Awadhpati, Gopal, Nandlal et cetera.

A verse from his poem forms his book "Amar Sidhi'' and is given below:

This poem has been written by considering God as husband.

Works 
He has written four Bhojpuri books which collectively have 3250 verses:

 Amar Sidhi (885 verses)
 Amar Bilas (875 verses)
Amar Faras (925 verses)
Amar Kahani (565 verses)

References

19th-century Indian poets
20th-century Indian poets
Poets from Bihar
Indian male poets
1841 births
1914 deaths